The 2015 Clearwater Men's Provincial Championship, the provincial men's curling championship of Nova Scotia, was held from February 4 to 8 at the Halifax Curling Club in Halifax. The winning Glen MacLeod team represented Nova Scotia at the 2015 Tim Hortons Brier in Calgary.

Teams

Round robin standings
Final Round Robin Standings

Scores

February 4
Draw 1
Dacey 6-5 Fitzner-Leblanc
Murphy 7-2 Mayhew
Stevens 8-4 Dexter
MacLeod 5-3 Sullivan

Draw 2
Dexter 8-3 Mayhew
Dacey 7-4 Sullivan
Fitzner-Leblanc 7-6 MacLeod
Murphy 7-5 Stevens

February 5

Draw 3
Fitzner-Leblanc 7-6 Sullivan
Stevens 10-5 Mayhew
Murphy 10-5 Dexter
MacLeod 8-6 Dacey

Draw 4
MacLeod 6-4 Murphy
Dacey 8-4 Dexter
Sullivan 6-4 Mayhew
Stevens 8-6 Fitzner-Leblanc

Draw 5
Dexter 8-4 Sullivan
Fitzner-Leblanc 6-5 Murphy
Stevens 5-3 MacLeod 
Dacey 10-6 Mayhew

February 6
Draw 6
Stevens 9–8 Dacey
Dexter 5–6 MacLeod
Fitzner-Leblanc 7–3 Mayhew
Murphy 8–3 Sullivan

Draw 7
Mayhew 5–6 MacLeod
Stevens 5–6 Sullivan
Dacey 1–6 Murphy
Dexter 8–7 Fitzner-Leblanc

Tiebreaker
Saturday, February 7, 8:00 am

Playoffs

1 vs. 2
Saturday, February 7, 2:00 pm

3 vs. 4
Saturday, February 7, 2:00 pm

Semifinal
Saturday, February 7, 7:00 pm

Final
Sunday, February 8, 2:00 pm

References

2015 Tim Hortons Brier
Curling in Nova Scotia
Sport in Halifax, Nova Scotia
2015 in Nova Scotia
February 2015 sports events in Canada